A waterscape is an aquatic landscape. Waterscape may also refer to:

 Waterscape, a website maintained by British Waterways from 2003 to 2012
 "Waterscape", a 2005 art installation by Anna Valentina Murch at San Jose City Hall